Mannington  may refer to:

Mannington, Dorset, England
Mannington, Kentucky, United States
Mannington, Norfolk, England, the location of Mannington Hall
Mannington Township, New Jersey, in Salem County, United States
Mannington, West Virginia, a city in Marion County, United States

See also
Mannington Creek, in New Jersey